Christchurch is the largest city in the South Island of New Zealand and the seat of the Canterbury Region. Christchurch lies on the South Island's east coast, just north of Banks Peninsula on Pegasus Bay. The Avon River / Ōtākaro flows through the centre of the city, with an urban park along its banks. The city's territorial authority population is  people, and includes a number of smaller urban areas as well as rural areas. The population of the urban area is  people. Christchurch is the second-largest city by urban area population in New Zealand, after Auckland. It is the major urban area of an emerging sub-region known as Greater Christchurch. Notable smaller urban areas within this sub-region include Rangiora and Kaiapoi in Waimakariri District, north of the Waimakariri River, and Rolleston and Lincoln in Selwyn District to the south.

The first inhabitants migrated to the area sometime between 1000 and 1250 AD. They hunted moa, which led to the birds' extinction by 1450, and destroyed much of the mataī and tōtara forest. The first iwi to settle the area that would later become known as Christchurch were the Waitaha, who migrated to the area in the 16th century. They were followed later by the Kāti Māmoe, who conquered the Waitaha. In the 16th and 17th centuries, the Ngāi Tahu migrated to the area and subjugated the Kāti Māmoe. Over time Ngāi Tahu would develop a large pā based around Kaiapoi, which was a major centre for the trade of pounamu.

Christchurch became a city by Royal Charter on 31 July 1856, making it officially the oldest established city in New Zealand. The Canterbury Association, which settled the Canterbury Plains, named the city after Christ Church, Oxford. The new settlement was laid out in a grid pattern centred on Cathedral Square; during the 19th century there were few barriers to the rapid growth of the urban area, except for the Pacific to the east and the Port Hills to the south. Agriculture is the historic mainstay of Christchurch's economy. The early presence of the University of Canterbury and the heritage of the city's academic institutions in association with local businesses has fostered a number of technology-based industries. Christchurch is one of five Antarctic gateway cities, hosting Antarctic support bases for several nations.

The city suffered a series of earthquakes between September 2010 and January 2012, with the most destructive occurring at 12.51 p.m. on 22 February 2011, in which 185 people were killed and thousands of buildings across the city suffered severe damage, with a few central city buildings collapsing. By late 2013, 1,500 buildings in the city had been demolished, leading to ongoing recovery and rebuilding projects. The city later became the site of a terrorist attack targeting two mosques on 15 March 2019, in which 51 people were killed, and which was described by the Prime Minister, Jacinda Ardern, as "one of New Zealand's darkest days".

Etymology
The name of "Christchurch" was agreed on at the first meeting of the Canterbury Association on 27 March 1848. It was suggested by founder John Robert Godley, whose alma mater was Christ Church, University of Oxford.

The Māori name Ōtautahi ("the place of Tautahi") was adopted in the 1930s; originally it was the name of a specific site by the Avon River (near present-day Kilmore Street). The site was a seasonal dwelling of Ngāi Tahu chief Te Potiki Tautahi, whose main home was Port Levy on Banks Peninsula. Prior to that the Ngāi Tahu generally referred to the Christchurch area as Karaitiana, a transliteration of the English word Christian.

"ChCh" is sometimes used as an abbreviation of "Christchurch".

In New Zealand Sign Language, "Christchurch" is signed with two Cs.

History

Māori settlement
Archaeological evidence found in a cave at Redcliffs in 1876 has indicated that the Christchurch area was first settled by moa-hunting tribes about 1250 AD. These first inhabitants were thought to have been followed by the Waitaha iwi, who are said to have migrated from the East coast of the North Island in the 16th century. Following tribal warfare, the Waitaha (made of three peoples) were dispossessed by the Ngāti Māmoe iwi. They were in turn subjugated by the Ngāi Tahu iwi, who remained in control until the arrival of European settlers 600 years later.

Land covered in mataī and tōtara forest was cleared in what is now the central city, and in 1500 the population increased due to Kāti Māmoe and then further Ngāi Tahu migration. The largest single settlement was at Kaiapoi's pā, a bustling fortification controlled by the powerful Ngāi Tahu hapū Kāi Tūāhuriri. This pā was founded by the nobleman Tūrākautahi, and was run by his family and prestigious tohunga in a highly sophisticated social and economic fabric. Tūrākautahi's hapū, Kāi Tūāhuriri, was named for his father, the important leader Tūāhuriri. Tūāhuriri a powerful chief who had influence and control over vast swathes of Christchurch, Nelson and Wellington, before a conflict with his brother-in-law Tutekawa caused him to drown in Te Roto o Wairewa (Lake Forsyth). The settlement remained where it was, controlled by Tūāhuriri's descendants, until it was sacked in the 1830s by Te Rauparaha.

European settlement

After the purchase of land at Putaringamotu (modern Riccarton) by the Weller brothers, whalers of Otago and Sydney, a party of European settlers led by Herriott and McGillivray established themselves in what is now Christchurch, early in 1840. Their abandoned holdings were taken over by brothers William and John Deans in 1843 who stayed. The First Four Ships were chartered by the Canterbury Association and brought the first 792 of the Canterbury Pilgrims to Lyttelton Harbour. These sailing vessels were the Randolph, Charlotte Jane, and Cressy. The Charlotte Jane was the first to arrive on 16 December 1850. The Canterbury Pilgrims had aspirations of building a city around a cathedral and college, on the model of Christ Church in Oxford.

The name "Christ Church" was decided before the ships' arrival, at the Association's first meeting, on 27 March 1848. The exact basis for the name is not known. It has been suggested that it is named for Christchurch, in Dorset, England; for Canterbury Cathedral; or in honour of Christ Church, Oxford. The last explanation is the one generally accepted.

At the request of the Deans brothers – whose farm was the earliest European settlement in the area – the river was named after the River Avon in Scotland, which rises in the Ayrshire hills near to where their grandfather's farm was located.

Captain Joseph Thomas, the Canterbury Association's Chief Surveyor, surveyed the surrounding area. By December 1849 he had commissioned the construction of a road from Port Cooper, later Lyttelton, to Christchurch via Sumner. However, this proved more difficult than expected and road construction was stopped while a steep foot and pack horse track was constructed over the hill between the port and the Heathcote valley, where access to the site of the proposed settlement could be gained. This track became known as the Bridle Path, because the path was so steep that pack horses needed to be led by the bridle.

Goods that were too heavy or bulky to be transported by pack horse over the Bridle Path were shipped by small sailing vessels some eight miles (13 km) by water round the coast and up the Avon Heathcote Estuary to Ferrymead. New Zealand's first public railway line, the Ferrymead Railway, opened from Ferrymead to Christchurch in 1863. Due to the difficulties in travelling over the Port Hills and the dangers associated with shipping navigating the Sumner bar, a railway tunnel was built through the Port Hills to Lyttelton, opening in 1867.

Christchurch became a city by royal charter on 31 July 1856, the first in New Zealand. Many of the city's Gothic Revival buildings by architect Benjamin Mountfort date from this period. Christchurch was the seat of provincial administration for the Province of Canterbury, which was abolished in 1876. By 1874, Christchurch was New Zealand's fourth largest city with a population of 14,270 residents. 

Heavy rain caused the Waimakariri River to flood Christchurch in February 1868. Victoria Square (known as Market Place at the time) was left underwater with “the whole left side of the [Avon] river from Montreal-street bridge to Worcester street was all one lake, as deep as up to a horse's belly”.  Christchurch buildings were damaged by earthquakes in 1869, 1881 and 1888. The 1888 earthquake caused the highest 7.8 metres of the Christchurch Cathedral spire to collapse. Mark Twain described Christchurch in 1895 "where half the people ride bicycles and the other half are kept busy dodging them".

1901–2000
In 1901 an earthquake measuring 6.9, centred near Cheviot, caused the spire on top of Christchurch Cathedral to collapse again, but this time only the top 1.5 metres fell. On this occasion it was rebuilt with timber and metal instead of stone.

In 1906, the New Zealand International Exhibition opened in Hagley Park. More than one million people visited the exhibition. In 1908 a large fire which started at the Stranges Department Store destroyed buildings in central Christchurch on High St, Cashel St and Lichfield Streets.

Christchurch started to receive a regular supply of electricity from the Lake Coleridge hydroelectric scheme in April 1915 and as a result the first electric lights became operational in Christchurch in May 1915.

The Spanish Flu epidemic arrived in Christchurch in November 1918. It would eventually lead to the deaths of 466 Christchurch people.

The population of Christchurch exceeded 100,000 for the first time in 1919.

The first set of traffic lights was installed in Christchurch in 1930 at the intersection of Cashel and Colombo Streets.

In 1940, after several years of planning, Harewood Airport opened for flying. This was developed over a number of years to become Christchurch International Airport and in 1950 it was New Zealand's first international airport.

In 1947, New Zealand's worst fire disaster occurred at Ballantyne's Department Store in the inner city, with 41 people killed in a blaze which razed the rambling collection of buildings.  

In November 1957, a Bristol Freighter crashed into the Russley Golf Course killing the two crew and two passengers on board. In December 1957, Christchurch was affected by a one in 100 year flooding event with the Waimakariri River bursting its stop banks near the suburb of Belfast.

The Lyttelton road tunnel between Lyttelton and Christchurch was opened in 1964.

In 1969, the one-way system running through central Christchurch was established. The first two streets to be made one-way were Lichfield and St Asaph streets. They were followed by Barbadoes, Madras, Salisbury and Kilmore streets.

The Christchurch Town Hall was opened in 1972.

Christchurch hosted the 1974 British Commonwealth Games.

The Al-Noor Mosque was opened in 1985, this being the second in the country at that time.

Christchurch was hit by the biggest snowstorm in 30 years in August 1992 which left snow up to a foot deep in some parts of Christchurch. In the wider Canterbury area, more than one million sheep had died as a result of the snow and cold conditions.

21st century

2010–2012 earthquakes

On Saturday 4 September 2010, a magnitude 7.1 earthquake struck Christchurch and the central Canterbury region at 4:35 am.

Nearly six months later on Tuesday 22 February 2011, a second earthquake measuring magnitude 6.3 struck the city at 12:51 pm.

Although lower on the moment magnitude scale than the previous earthquake, the intensity and violence of the ground shaking was measured to be IX (Violent), among the strongest ever recorded globally in an urban area and 185 people were killed. People from more than 20 countries were among the victims. The city's ChristChurch Cathedral was severely damaged and lost its spire. The collapse of the CTV Building resulted in the majority of fatalities. Widespread damage across Christchurch resulted in loss of homes, major buildings and infrastructure. Significant liquefaction affected the eastern suburbs, and the total cost to insurers of rebuilding has been estimated at NZ$20–30 billion.

There were continuing aftershocks for some time, with 4,558 above a magnitude 3.0 recorded in the Canterbury region from 4 September 2010 to 3 September 2014. Particularly large events on 13 June 2011, 23 December 2011, and 2 January 2012 all caused further damage and minor injuries; but no further deaths. Following the earthquakes over 1500 buildings in the city had been demolished or partly demolished by September 2013.

The city experienced rapid growth following the earthquakes. A Christchurch Central Recovery Plan guides rebuilding in the central city. There has been massive growth in the residential sector, with around 50,000 new houses expected to be constructed in the Greater Christchurch area by 2028 as outlined in the Land Use Recovery Plan (LURP).

2017 bushfires
On 13 February 2017, two bush fires started on the Port Hills. These merged over the next two days and the single very large wild fire extended down both sides of the Port Hill almost reaching Governors Bay in the south-west, and the Westmorland, Kennedys Bush, and Dyers Pass Road almost down to the Sign of the Takahe.

2019 terrorist attack

Fifty-one people died from two consecutive mass shootings at Al Noor Mosque and Linwood Islamic Centre by an Australian white supremacist carried out on 15 March 2019. Forty others were injured. The attacks have been described by Prime Minister Jacinda Ardern as "one of New Zealand's darkest days". On 2 June 2020, the attacker pleaded guilty to multiple charges of murder, attempted murder, and terrorism. On 27 August, he was sentenced to life in prison without parole, the first time such a sentence was handed down in New Zealand.

Geography

Christchurch lies in Canterbury, near the centre of the east coast of the South Island, east of the Canterbury Plains. It is located near the southern end of Pegasus Bay, and is bounded to the east by the Pacific Ocean coast and the estuary of the Avon and Heathcote Rivers. To the south and south-east the urban portion of the city is limited by the volcanic slopes of the Port Hills separating it from Banks Peninsula. To the north the city is bounded by the braided Waimakariri River.

Christchurch is one of a group of only four current cities in the world to have been carefully planned following the same layout of a central city square, four complementing city squares surrounding it and a parklands area that embrace the city centre. The first city built with this pattern was Philadelphia. Later came Savannah and Adelaide, before Christchurch.

Christchurch has one of the highest-quality water supplies in the world, with its water rated among the purest and cleanest in the world. Untreated, naturally filtered water is sourced, via more than 50 pumping stations surrounding the city, from aquifers emanating from the foothills of the Southern Alps. However, since 2018 about 70% of Christchurch's water supply has been temporarily chlorinated due to well-head upgrades, and the chlorination is planned to be stopped after the upgrades have been completed and certified.

Central City

At the city's centre is Cathedral Square, surrounding the now-earthquake-damaged landmark Anglican cathedral, Christ Church. The area around this square and within the Four Avenues of Christchurch (Bealey Avenue, Fitzgerald Avenue, Moorhouse Avenue and Deans Avenue) is considered to be the central business district (CBD) of the city. The central city also has a number of residential areas, including Inner City East, Inner City West, Avon Loop, Moa Neighbourhood and Victoria, but many of the residential buildings in the CBD were demolished following the February 2011 earthquakes. Cathedral Square is located at the crossing of two major central streets, Colombo Street and Worcester Street.

Cathedral Square, the heart of the city, hosted attractions such as (until the February 2011 earthquake) the Wizard of New Zealand, Ian Brackenbury Channell, and evangelist Ray Comfort; regular market days; free standing food and coffee carts; an aquarium, pubs and restaurants and the city's chief tourist information centre. it is expected that activities in Cathedral Square will increase as the rebuild progresses. (After the 2011 earthquake the Wizard of New Zealand moved to New Regent Street. and operated there until he lost his contract with the city in 2021.)

The central city also includes the pedestrianised sections of Cashel and High streets commonly known pre-earthquakes as 'City Mall'. Refurbished in 2008/09 the mall featured especially designed seating, flower and garden boxes, more trees, paving, and an extension to the central city tram route. The tram route extension was nearly complete when the February 2011 earthquake struck. Following the earthquakes, most buildings in Cashel Mall were demolished. A shopping area called Re:START opened on Cashel Street adjacent to Ballantyne's Department Store in October 2011. The Re:START mall was made of colourful shipping containers that were converted to house retail stores. The Bridge of Remembrance commemorating war dead stands at the western end of the mall, was repaired rededicated on Anzac Day, Monday 25 April 2016.

The Cultural Precinct provided a backdrop to a vibrant scene of ever-changing arts, cultural, and heritage attractions within an area of less than one square kilometre. The Arts Centre, the Canterbury Museum and the Art Gallery are located in the Cultural Precinct. The majority of the activities were free and a printable map was provided. There areas are slowly being reopened follow earthquake repair and strengthening work.

In 2010, the Christchurch City Council released "A City For People Action Plan", a programme of work through to 2022 to improve public spaces within the central city to entice more inner city residents and visitors. A primary action was to reduce the impact of motorised private vehicles and increase the comfort of pedestrians and cyclists. The plan was based on a report prepared for the council by renowned Danish design firm Gehl Architects. Since the 2011 Christchurch earthquake, Wellington architect Ian Athfield has been selected to re-plan, although many varied suggestions have been promoted for rebuilding the central city.

The Central City, which was fully closed off following 22 February earthquake, opened in stages and was fully reopened in June 2013; although there were still some streets closed off due to earthquake damage, infrastructure repair work, and damaged buildings.

Inner suburbs
(clockwise, starting north of the city centre)

Mairehau
Shirley
Dallington
Richmond
Avonside
Linwood
Phillipstown
Woolston
Opawa
Waltham
St Martins
Beckenham
Sydenham
Somerfield
Spreydon
Addington
Riccarton
Ilam
Upper Riccarton
Burnside
Fendalton
Bryndwr
Strowan
Merivale
Papanui
St Albans
Edgeware

Outer suburbs
Some of these suburbs may also be considered subdivisions of larger suburbs.

(clockwise, starting north of the city centre)

Marshland
Bottle Lake
Burwood
Parklands
Prestons
Highfield
Waimairi Beach
Avondale
North New Brighton
New Brighton
Bexley (now largely defunct)
Aranui
Wainoni
South New Brighton
Southshore
Bromley
Mt Pleasant
Redcliffs
Moncks Bay
Clifton
Richmond Hill
Sumner
Scarborough Hill
Ferrymead
Heathcote Valley
Hillsborough
Murray Aynsley Hill
Huntsbury
Cashmere
Westmorland
Hoon Hay
Hillmorton
Aidanfield
Halswell
Kennedys Bush
Oaklands
Westlake
Longhurst
Knight Stream Park
Wigram
Middleton
Sockburn
Hornby
Hei Hei
Broomfield
Islington
Yaldhurst
Russley
Avonhead
Harewood
Bishopdale
Northcote
Casebrook
Redwood
Regents Park
Styx Mill
Northwood
Groynes Park
Belfast
Spencerville
Brooklands

Satellite towns
Towns and settlements in the functional urban area include:

Leeston
Lyttelton
Governors Bay
Diamond Harbour
Tai Tapu
Little River
Lincoln
Prebbleton
Rolleston
Templeton
West Melton
Rangiora
Woodend
Waikuku
Pegasus
Kaiapoi
Kainga
Pines Beach
Motukarara

Climate

Christchurch has a temperate oceanic climate (Köppen: Cfb) with a mild summer, cool winter, and regular moderate rainfall. Summer in the city is mostly warm but is often moderated by a sea breeze from the north-east. A notable feature of the weather is the nor'wester, a hot föhn wind that occasionally reaches storm force, causing widespread minor damage to property. Like many cities, Christchurch experiences an urban heat island effect; temperatures are slightly higher within the inner city regions compared to the surrounding countryside.

In winter it is common for the temperature to fall below  at night. There are on average 80 days of ground frost per year. Snowfall occurs on average three times per year, although in some years none is recorded.

On cold winter nights, the surrounding hills, clear skies, and frosty calm conditions often combine to form a stable inversion layer above the city that traps vehicle exhausts and smoke from domestic fires to cause smog. While not as bad as smog in Los Angeles or Mexico City, Christchurch smog has often exceeded World Health Organisation recommendations for air pollution. To limit air pollution, the regional council banned the use of open fires in the city in 2006. In 2008 council prohibited the use of woodburners more than 15 years old, while making funding available to upgrade domestic home heating systems.

Demographics

This is the second-most populous area administered by a single council in New Zealand, and the largest city in the South Island. The population comprises  people in the Christchurch urban area,  people in the Lyttelton urban area,  people in the Diamond Harbour urban area, and  people in rural settlements and areas.

Christchurch City had a population of 369,006 at the 2018 New Zealand census, an increase of 27,537 people (8.1%) since the 2013 census, and an increase of 20,550 people (5.9%) since the 2006 census. There were 138,381 households. There were 183,972 males and 185,034 females, giving a sex ratio of 0.99 males per female. The median age was 37.1 years (compared with 37.4 years nationally), with 63,699 people (17.3%) aged under 15 years, 82,971 (22.5%) aged 15 to 29, 166,959 (45.2%) aged 30 to 64, and 55,377 (15.0%) aged 65 or older.

Ethnicities were 77.9% European/Pākehā, 9.9% Māori, 3.8% Pacific peoples, 14.9% Asian, and 2.9% other ethnicities. People may identify with more than one ethnicity.

The percentage of people born overseas was 26.8, compared with 27.1% nationally.

Although some people objected to giving their religion, 50.8% had no religion, 36.3% were Christian, 1.8% were Hindu, 1.1% were Muslim, 1.0% were Buddhist and 2.9% had other religions.

Of those at least 15 years old, 75,207 (24.6%) people had a bachelor or higher degree, and 49,554 (16.2%) people had no formal qualifications. The median income was $32,900, compared with $31,800 nationally. 50,229 people (16.5%) earned over $70,000 compared to 17.2% nationally. The employment status of those at least 15 was that 153,480 (50.3%) people were employed full-time, 46,011 (15.1%) were part-time, and 11,466 (3.8%) were unemployed.

Culture and identity

The table below shows the ethnic profile of Christchurch's population, as recorded in the censuses held between 2001 and 2018. The percentages add up to more than 100%, as some people counted themselves as belonging to more than one ethnic group. Figures for 2006 refer to just Christchurch City, not the whole urban area. The substantial percentage drop in the numbers of 'Europeans' in that census was mainly caused by the increasing numbers of people from this group choosing to define themselves as 'New Zealanders'–even though this was not one of the groups listed on the census form.

English is the most spoken language (95.9%) followed by Te Reo Maori (2.1%), Mandarin (1.9%), Tagalog (1.5%) and French (1.3%). Percentages add up to more than 100% as people may select more than one language.

Economy

Farming

The agricultural industry has always been the economic core of Christchurch. Its surrounding farming countryside has long been the basis of its industry, part of the original "package" sold to New Zealand immigrants. PGG Wrightson, New Zealand's leading agribusiness, is based in Christchurch. Its local roots go back to Pyne Gould Guinness, an old stock and station agency serving the South Island.

Other agribusinesses in Christchurch have included malting, seed development and dressing, wool and meat processing, and small biotechnology operations using by-products from meat works. Dairying has grown strongly in the surrounding areas with high world prices for milk products and the use of irrigation to lift grass growth on dry land. With its higher labour use this has helped stop declines in rural population. Many cropping and sheep farms have been converted to dairying. Conversions have been by agribusiness companies as well as by farmers, many of whom have moved south from North Island dairying strongholds such as Taranaki and the Waikato.

Cropping has always been important in the surrounding countryside. Wheat and barley and various strains of clover and other grasses for seed exporting have been the main crops. These have all created processing businesses in Christchurch. In recent years, regional agriculture has diversified, with a thriving wine industry springing up at Waipara, and beginnings of new horticulture industries such as olive production and processing. Deer farming has led to new processing using antlers for Asian medicine and aphrodisiacs. The high quality local wine in particular has increased the appeal of Canterbury and Christchurch to tourists.

Industry
Christchurch is the second largest manufacturing centre in New Zealand behind Auckland, the sector being the second largest contributor to the local economy, with firms such as Anderson's making steel work for bridges, tunnels, and hydro-electric dams in the early days of infrastructure work. Now manufacturing is mainly of light products and the key market is Australia, with firms such as those pioneered by the Stewart family among the larger employers. Before clothing manufacture largely moved to Asia, Christchurch was the centre of the New Zealand clothing industry, with firms such as LWR Industries. The firms that remain mostly design and market, and manufacture in Asia. The city also had five footwear manufacturers, but these have been replaced by imports.

In the last few decades, technology-based industries have sprung up in Christchurch. Angus Tait founded Tait Electronics, a mobile-radio manufacturer, and other firms spun off from this, such as Dennis Chapman's Swichtec. In software, Cantabrian Gil Simpson founded a company that made LINC and Jade programming languages and a management buyout spawned local firm Wynyard Group.

There have also been spin-offs from the electrical department of the University of Canterbury engineering school. These included Pulse Data, which became Human Ware (making reading devices and computers for blind people and those with limited vision) and CES Communications (encryption). The Pulse Data founders had moved from the Canterbury University engineering school to work for Wormald Inc. when they set up Pulse Data through a Management buyout of their division.. Spin-off company Invert Robotics developed the world's first climbing robot capable of climbing on stainless steel, aimed at the dairy tank inspection market.

In recent times, the University of Canterbury engineering school and computer science department play an important role in supplying staff and research for the technology industries, and the Christchurch Polytechnic Institute of Technology provides a flow of trained technicians and engineers. Locally and nationally, the IT sector is known not for its size (the third largest in New Zealand) but for producing innovative and entrepreneurial solutions, products and concepts.

Tourism
Tourism is also a significant factor of the local economy. The close proximity of the ski fields and other attractions of the Southern Alps, and hotels, a casino, and an airport that meet international standards make Christchurch a stopover destination for many tourists.

Gateway to the Antarctic

Antarctic exploration
Christchurch has a history of involvement in Antarctic exploration – both Robert Falcon Scott and Ernest Shackleton used the port of Lyttelton as a departure point for expeditions, and in the central city there is a statue of Scott sculpted by his widow, Kathleen Scott. Within the city, the Canterbury Museum preserves and exhibits many historic artefacts and stories of Antarctic exploration.

The International Antarctic Centre provides both base facilities and a museum and visitor centre focused upon current Antarctic activities. The United States Navy and United States Air National Guard, augmented by the New Zealand and Australian air forces, use Christchurch Airport as the take-off point for the main supply route to McMurdo and Scott Bases in Antarctica. The Clothing Distribution Center in Christchurch had more than 140,000 pieces of extreme cold weather gear for issue to nearly 2,000 US Antarctic Program participants in the 2007–08 season.

Government

Local government

Christchurch's local government is a democracy with various elements including:
Christchurch City Council, comprising the Mayor of Christchurch, and 16 councillors elected in 16 wards: Spreydon, Cashmere, Halswell, Riccarton, Hornby, Fendalton, Waimairi, Papanui, Innes, Central, Linwood, Heathcote, Harewood, Burwood, Coastal, and Banks Peninsula.
Community boards, currently six, typically covering 3 wards with 2 members elected and one councillor appointed from each (9 members): Waihoro Spreydon-Cashmere-Heathcote, Waipapa Papanui-Innes-Central, Waipuna Halswell-Hornby-Riccarton, Waimaero Fendalton-Waimairi-Harewood, Waitai Coastal-Burwood-Linwood; the exception to this rule being the one covering Te Pātaka o Rākaihautū Banks Peninsula where all members are elected from 4 subdivisions within the Banks Peninsula Ward (Akaroa, Mount Herbert, Lyttelton, Wairewa) alongside the Ward Councillor.
District councils in surrounding areas: Selwyn, and Waimakariri. The Banks Peninsula district council was amalgamated into Christchurch City in March 2006 after a vote by the Banks Peninsula residents to disestablish in November 2005.
Canterbury Regional Council, known as 'Environment Canterbury', including four Christchurch constituencies with two members from each constituency.
Prior to the disestablishment of the district health board model during the 2022 local elections, elections were also held for the Canterbury District Health Board, with five members for Christchurch.

Some of the local governments in Canterbury and the NZ Transport Agency have created the Greater Christchurch Urban Development Strategy to facilitate future urban planning.

Central government
Christchurch is covered by seven general electorates (and ) and one Māori electorate (Te Tai Tonga), each returning one member to the New Zealand House of Representatives. As of the 2020 New Zealand general election there are five general electorate members of the Labour party and two members of the National party. The Māori electorate is represented by the Labour Party.

Culture and entertainment

Christchurch is a distinctly English city, however it contains various European elements, with strong Gothic Revival architecture. As early settlers of New Zealand, Māori culture is also prevalent in the city. It features many public open spaces and parks, river beds and cafés and restaurants situated in the city centre and surrounding suburbs.

Cinema
Historically most cinemas were grouped around Cathedral Square,.

Only one of the first generation of suburban cinemas, the Hollywood in Sumner, remains open. The largest multiplexes were the Hoyts 8 in the old railway station on Moorhouse Avenue (now demolished) and Reading Cinemas (also eight screens) in the Palms shopping centre in Shirley. Hoyts in Riccarton opened in 2005 with one of its screens for a time holding the record for the largest in New Zealand.

The Rialto Cinemas on Moorhouse avenue specialised in international films and art house productions. The Rialto also hosted the majority of the city's various film festivals and was home to the local film society. The Rialto was closed following the February 2011 earthquake.

The Canterbury Film Society is active in the city.

The Peter Jackson film Heavenly Creatures (1994), starring Melanie Lynskey and Kate Winslet, was set in Christchurch.

Parks and nature
The large number of public parks and well-developed residential gardens with many trees has given Christchurch the name of The Garden City. Hagley Park and the 30-hectare (75 acre) Christchurch Botanic Gardens, founded in 1863, are in the central city, with Hagley Park being a site for sports such as golf, cricket, netball, and rugby, and for open-air concerts by local bands and orchestras. To the north of the city is the Willowbank wildlife park. Travis Wetland, an ecological restoration programme to create a wetland, is to the east of the city centre in the suburb of Burwood.

Orana Wildlife Park is New Zealand's only open-range zoo, sitting on 80 hectares of land, located on the outskirts of Christchurch.

Television
Television broadcasts began in Christchurch on 1 June 1961 with the launch of channel CHTV3, making Christchurch the second New Zealand city (behind Auckland) to receive regular television broadcasts. The channel initially broadcast from a 10-kilowatt transmitter atop the Gloucester Street studios until it switched to the newly built 100-kilowatt Sugarloaf transmitter in the Port Hills on 28 August 1965. In November 1969, CHTV3 was networked with its counterpart stations in Auckland, Wellington and Dunedin for form NZBC TV, the predecessor to today's TVNZ 1.

Christchurch had its own regional television station Canterbury Television. CTV was first formed in 1991 and ceased broadcasting on 16 December 2016. It aired both local, national and international content, including DW-TV and Al-jazeera World. Since 19 December 2016 CTV has operated as a web-based platform under the Star Media brand.

VTV, a Korean TV channel airs in Christchurch (also Auckland). It offers English content about Korea, from arirang World, and Korean-speaking content in SBS. This channel broadcasts many of the latest dramas airing in Korea.

All television channels in Christchurch have been broadcast in digital since analogue switch-off on 28 April 2013.

Theatre
Christchurch has one full-time professional theatre, the Court Theatre, founded in 1971. Originally based in the Christchurch Arts Centre, the Court Theatre has been located in the suburb of Addington in temporary accommodation following the 2011 earthquakes. Alongside the Court is the co-operative and experimental Free Theatre Christchurch, established in 1979 and based in the Arts Centre from 1982, and Showbiz Christchurch, an incorporated society established in 1938 and primarily producing musical theatre. There is also an active recreational theatre scene with community-based theatre companies, such as the Christchurch Repertory Society, Elmwood Players, Riccarton Players, and Canterbury Children's Theatre, producing many quality shows. The Ngaio Marsh Theatre, located at the University of Canterbury, hosts a range of student drama groups, as well as other theatre groups. The Isaac Theatre Royal was originally opened in 1863, and has since been rebuilt four times, most recently following the 2011 Christchurch earthquake. The Isaac Theatre Royal reopened to the public on 17 November 2014.

Music
The city is known for its many live acts, including a professional symphony orchestra. After the closure of Canterbury Opera in 2006, due to financial reasons, in 2009 another professional opera company, Southern Opera, was founded. After the 2010 and 2011 earthquakes, it suspended its activities, before merging with New Zealand Opera in 2013.
Christchurch is a home for the experimental music scene of New Zealand. The town is the home to such bands as The Bats, The Narcs, Shocking Pinks, Slim and Bailter Space.

There are usually buskers around the town square and Christchurch also hosts the World Buskers Festival in January each year. Singer-songwriter Hayley Westenra launched her international career by busking in Christchurch.

Some of New Zealand's acts such as Shapeshifter, Ladi6, Tiki Taane and Truth are from Christchurch. Promoters, Venues and clubs such as Bassfreaks, The Bedford and Dux Live regularly have international and New Zealand acts within the Drum and Bass scene performing live in Christchurch, along with dance parties, raves and gigs all featuring NZ and local Drum and Bass DJs, with often two or three happening on a single night or weekend (e.g. 2010 when UK Dubstep DJ Doctor P with Crushington was playing at The Bedford, while simultaneously Concord Dawn featuring Trei and Bulletproof was playing at Ministry). Independent Christchurch based radio station Pulzar FM is one of the few radio stations in New Zealand that plays Drum and Bass during the day.

In recent developments, hip hop has effectively landed in Christchurch. In 2000, First Aotearoa Hip Hop Summit was held there. And in 2003, Christchurch's Scribe released his debut album in New Zealand and has received five times platinum in that country, in addition to achieving two number one singles.

Venues

The Christchurch Arena is New Zealand's second-largest permanent multipurpose arena, seating between 5,000 and 8,000, depending on configuration. It is home of the Mainland Tactix netball side. It was the venue for the 1999 World Netball championships, and has been host to many concerts

The Christchurch Town Hall auditorium (2,500 seats, opened 1972) was the first major auditorium design by architects Warren and Mahoney and acousticians Marshall Day. It is still recognised as a model example of concert-hall design with an excellent modern pipe organ. The hall reopened on 23 February 2019, after being closed for eight years for repair after the significant damage caused by the February 2011 Christchurch earthquake.

Christchurch also has a casino, and there are also a wide range of live music venues – some short-lived, others with decades of history. Classical music concerts were held at the Christchurch Music Centre until it was demolished as a result of earthquake damage. The Piano was built to offer a variety of performance spaces for music and the arts.

In late 2014 it was announced that a 284 million dollar project was underway to build a convention centre located on the block defined by Armagh Street, Oxford Terrace, Worcester Street and Colombo Street. Gloucester Street becomes part of the Centre itself, but allows for retail use and public access. The convention centre, now called Te Pae, hosts several events at the same time; starting with space for up to 2,000 people, this complements facilities in Auckland and Queenstown. Te Pae opened on 17 December 2021.

Sport

Teams
Crusaders, formerly the 'Canterbury Crusaders', are a rugby union team based in Christchurch that compete in the Super Rugby competition.
The Canterbury Rugby Football Union, which governs rugby union in Christchurch and the surrounding region, fields a team that represents the city in the Mitre 10 Cup.
Canterbury Kings are Christchurch's men's cricket team in New Zealand's Super Smash while the Canterbury Magicians play in the counterpart women's tournament
Canterbury Cavaliers and Cats play in the National Hockey League (NHL)
Canterbury Tactix play in the national ANZ Premiership, after the trans-Tasman ANZ Championship netball league finished in 2016. Prior to 2008, the Canterbury Flames played in the national netball league, competing for the National Bank Cup.
Canterbury United play in the New Zealand Football Championship.
Canterbury Rams play in the National Basketball League.
Canterbury Red Devils play in the New Zealand Ice Hockey League (NZIHL).
In addition, Christchurch Football Club, an amateur rugby union club, was founded in 1863, believed to be the oldest club of any code in New Zealand.

Events
1974 British Commonwealth Games
1982 Women's Cricket World Cup
1989 XVI World Games for the Deaf
1992 Cricket World Cup
1999 World Netball Championships
2000 Women's Cricket World Cup
2011 IPC Athletics World Championships
2015 Cricket World Cup
2022 Women's Cricket World Cup

Venues

Addington Raceway at Addington has been a venue for harness racing since 1899. Racing is conducted by the New Zealand Metropolitan Trotting Club and it is regarded as the premier venue for the sport in New Zealand. 
Alpine Ice is an ice skating rink home to the Canterbury Red Devils. It has hosted many national and international Ice Hockey tournaments, figure skating and speed skating events. The rink is home to Ice Sports in Canterbury, in turn hosting numerous Ice Sports Clubs including the Canterbury Ice Hockey Association.
English Park in St Albans is the home venue for the Canterbury United Football team that plays in the national league.
Golf courses: Christchurch has more than a dozen golf courses, and has hosted the PGA Tour of Australasia/Nationwide Tour co-sanctioned Clearwater Classic/NZ PGA Championship at Clearwater Resort since 2002.
Rugby League Park
Hagley Oval, located within the southern portion of Hagley Park, has been used on-and-off as a venue for local, national and international cricket matches for decades, and was upgraded in 2014 as part of preparation for the 2015 Cricket World Cup. This included the construction of a new pavilion and embankment for seating, since which point the ground has returned to prominence as a dedicated cricket ground for all levels of the game. 
Christchurch Arena in Addington, Christchurch. Hosted the 1999 Netball World Championships and continues to host international basketball and netball games.
Lancaster Park (formerly Jade Stadium & AMI Stadium) was Christchurch's premier outdoor sporting ground, which played host to rugby union in the winter months and cricket in the summer months. It was home to the Crusaders Super Rugby and Canterbury Air New Zealand Cup rugby teams. It was also used by the New Zealand national cricket team and occasionally hosted a New Zealand Warriors rugby league match. It had a capacity of around 40,000 people for sporting fixtures, and around 50,000 for concerts. Damaged during the 2011 February earthquake, the facility was subsequently demolished in 2019 with the aim to return it to use as community sports fields.
Malvern Park in St Albans hosts inter-high school competition matches as well as minor league matches. Also training grounds for the Canterbury Crusaders.
Nunweek Park in Bishopdale is the main hockey venue in the city. Porritt Park in Avonside was the main venue until the 2010 Canterbury earthquake, when it was damaged by liquefaction.
Queen Elizabeth II Park was built for the 1974 British Commonwealth Games, which Christchurch hosted. It is used primarily as an athletics park, but also contains a newly upgraded swimming pool complex. It has hosted major concerts from bands such as AC/DC and the Red Hot Chili Peppers. The facility has been demolished due to damage sustained in the February 2011 earthquake.
Riccarton Park is a major thoroughbred racing venue.
Denton Park is home for track cycling and the Canterbury Track Cycling Club 
There are several mountain biking venues in Christchurch including McLean's Island, Bottle Lake Forest and the Christchurch Adventure Park which has a chair lift to take riders up to the top of Worsley's Hill to access the 22+ downhill mountain bike tracks.
Mike Pero Motorsport Park is the main motorsport venue in the area, with Ruapuna Speedway located nearby, which attracts dirt racing fans.

Ski fields
Skiing is popular, and there are ski fields an easy drive from Christchurch, including: 
Mount Hutt 
Porters
Mount Cheeseman
Broken River
Mount Olympus
Craigieburn

Education

Secondary schools
Christchurch is home to the fourth largest school in New Zealand, co-educational state school Burnside High School, with  pupils. Cashmere High School, Papanui High School and Riccarton High School are other large schools. There are four single-sex state schools: Shirley Boys' High School, Christchurch Boys' High School, Avonside Girls' High School and Christchurch Girls' High School.

Christchurch is also home to several single sex private church schools, some of them of the traditional English public school type. These include St Thomas of Canterbury College, St Margaret's College, Christ's College, St Bede's College, Marian College, Catholic Cathedral College, St Andrew's College, Villa Maria College and Rangi Ruru Girls' School. Less conventional schools in the city include  Ao Tawhiti, Hagley Community College, and the Christchurch Rudolf Steiner School.

Tertiary institutions
A number of tertiary education institutions have campuses in Christchurch, or in the surrounding areas.
Ara Institute of Canterbury
Lincoln University
University of Canterbury
University of Otago, Christchurch

Transport

Christchurch is served by Christchurch Airport and by buses (local and long-distance) and trains. The local bus service, known as Metro, is provided by Environment Canterbury. The car, however, remains the dominant form of transport in the city, as with the rest of New Zealand.

Christchurch has over 2,300 km of roads, of this 360 km is unpaved and 43 km is motorway. Christchurch has three motorways consisting of the Christchurch Northern Motorway (includes the Western Belfast Bypass), Christchurch Southern Motorway and the Christchurch-Lyttelton Motorway.

Christchurch has an extensive bus network with bus routes serving most areas of the city and satellite towns. Nearly all bus routes travelled through the central city Bus Exchange before the earthquake but due to reduced passenger numbers since the earthquakes, especially in the central city, the bus network was reorganised to direct more localised services to hubs, such as major shopping centres, where they connect to the central station via core bus routes. Before the 2011 earthquakes, in addition to normal bus services, Christchurch also had a pioneering zero-fare hybrid bus service, the Shuttle, in the inner city. The service has been suspended following the earthquakes and it is unclear whether it will resume again in the future. Bus services are also available leaving Christchurch, daily passenger bus services operates between Dunedin and Christchurch on the State Highway 1.

Historically, Christchurch has been known as New Zealand's cycling city and currently still attracts about 7% of commuters cycling. The central city has very flat terrain and the Christchurch City Council has established a network of cycle lanes and paths, such as the Railway Cycleway. Post-quake public consultation on rebuilding the city expressed a strong desire for a more sustainable transport system, particularly greater use of cycling again, and this has been reflected in the council's strategic transport plan.  The Christchurch City Council has committed NZ$68.5 million to build a network of modern cycleways over the next five years.

There is a functioning tramway system in Christchurch, but as a tourist attraction; its loop is restricted to a circuit of the central city. The trams were originally introduced in 1905 as a form of public transport, and ceased operating in 1954, but returned to the inner city (as a tourist attraction) in 1995. However, following the February 2011 earthquake, the system was damaged and within the cordoned off 'Red Zone' of the central city. The tramway reopened in November 2013 on a limited route, with plans to extend the tram route in 2014, first to reopen the complete pre-earthquake circuit, and then to open the extension travelling through the Re:Start Mall and High Street, which was being constructed when the 2011 earthquake struck.

There is a cable car system called the Christchurch Gondola which operates as a tourist attraction, providing transport from the Heathcote Valley to the top of Mount Cavendish in the city's south-east.

Rail services, both long-distance and commuter, used to focus on the former railway station on Moorhouse avenue. Commuter trains were progressively cancelled in the 1960s and 1970s. The last such service, between Christchurch and Rangiora, ceased in 1976. After the reduction in services a new Christchurch railway station was established at Addington Junction. The Main North Line railway travels northwards via Kaikoura to Picton and was served by the Coastal Pacific scheduled passenger train until its end in 2021, while the Main South Line heads to Invercargill via Dunedin and was used by the Southerner until its cancellation in 2002.

The most famous train to depart Christchurch is the TranzAlpine, which travels along the Main South Line to Rolleston and then turns onto the Midland Line, passes through the Southern Alps via the Otira Tunnel, and terminates in Greymouth on the West Coast. This trip is often regarded as one of the ten great train journeys in the world for the amazing scenery through which it passes. The TranzAlpine service is primarily a tourist service and carries no significant commuter traffic.

Christchurch Airport is located in Harewood,  to the north-west of the city centre. The airport serves as the major base for the New Zealand, Italian and United States Antarctic programs.

Utilities

Electricity
The Christchurch City Council established the city's first public electricity supply in 1903, and the city was connected to Coleridge Power Station in 1914. Up until 1989, electricity distribution and retailing in Christchurch was the responsibility of four entities: the Christchurch City Council Municipal Electricity Department (MED), Riccarton Electricity, the Port Hills Energy Authority, and the Central Canterbury Electric Power Board. In 1989, all four companies entered a joint venture, named Southpower. The 1998 electricity sector reforms required all electricity companies to separate their distribution and retailing businesses. Southpower retained its distribution business and sold its retail business to Meridian Energy. In December 1998, the lines business was renamed Orion New Zealand. Today, Orion owns and operates the local distribution network servicing the city, with electricity fed into it from two Transpower substations at Islington and Bromley.

The electricity distribution network in Christchurch suffered significant damage in the 2011 earthquakes, especially in the north-east where the 66,000-volt subtransmission cables supplying the area were damaged beyond repair. This necessitated major repairs to the existing infrastructure, as well as building new infrastructure to supply new housing developments.

At the 2013 census, 94.0% of Christchurch homes were heated wholly or partly by electricity, the highest in the country.

Sister cities

Christchurch's sister cities are:

 Adelaide, Australia (1972)
 Christchurch, Dorset,  England, United Kingdom (1972)
 Kurashiki, Okayama, Japan (1973)
 Seattle, Washington, United States (1981)
 Songpa-gu, Seoul,  South Korea (1995)
 Wuhan, Hubei, China (2006)

Christchurch also have friendly relations with Gansu Province in China.

See also
Christchurch City Holdings
List of radio stations in Christchurch
List of tallest buildings in Christchurch
List of people from Christchurch

References

Notes

Bibliography
Morrison, J.P. (1948). The evolution of a city : the story of the growth of the city and suburbs of Christchurch, the capital of Canterbury, in the years from 1850 to 1903. Christchurch: Christchurch City Council. 

Rice, Geoffrey (with assistance from Jean Sharfe)(1999) Christchurch changing: an illustrated history Christchurch: Canterbury University Press.  (pbk.)

External links

Christchurch City Council (official council website)
Christchurch and Canterbury (official tourism guide and visitor information)

 Christchurch
Populated places established in 1843
Former provincial capitals of New Zealand
1843 establishments in New Zealand